WKIK (1560 AM) was a United States commercial radio station serving La Plata and St. Charles, Maryland.  The station broadcast a country music format, simulcast with WKIK-FM (102.9). WKIK was licensed to Somar Communications, Inc and had a daytime-only license. 1560 AM is a United States clear-channel frequency.

The station was assigned the WKIK call letters by the Federal Communications Commission on September 25, 1995. The station surrendered its license on March 16, 2023; it was canceled the next day.

References

 David Gleason's American Radio History Archive: Broadcasting Yearbook Directory

External links

KIK
Charles County, Maryland
Radio stations established in 1965
1965 establishments in Maryland
Waldorf, Maryland
KIK
Radio stations disestablished in 2023
2023 disestablishments in Maryland
Defunct radio stations in the United States
KIK (1560 AM)